The Nurjol Boulevard, formerly known as Green Water Boulevard is a pedestrian zone in the business and administrative center on the left bank of Ishim river in Astana.  The Boulevard is one of the main attractions of the city and country. Both Nurzhol Boulevard and the layout of the city were designed by renowned architect Kisho Kurokawa. The boulevard runs from the President's residence Ak Orda to the marquee-shaped Khan Shatyr Entertainment Center (Хан Шатыр).
 
Along the boulevard there is a row of buildings designed by well-known domestic and foreign architects, including the city's most recognisable structure, the Bayterek.

Gallery

References

Nurzhol Boulevard
Museum districts
National squares
Pedestrian malls